100 Huntley Street is a Canadian Christian daily television talk show and the flagship program of Crossroads Christian Communications based in Burlington, Ontario, Canada. It is the longest-running Canadian daily television show, with over 10,300 episodes.

Created in 1976 by David Mainse, it first aired on June 15, 1977, from its first studios, located at 100 Huntley Street in the St. James Town area of downtown Toronto with Mainse as the original host. Originally 90 minutes long, it now lasts 30 minutes. The program currently airs at 9 a.m. and 9 p.m. weekdays on Yes TV. Guests included Malcolm Muggeridge, Colonel Harland Sanders, Billy Graham and Charlton Heston.

References

External links
 {{Official Website/}}
 

1970s Canadian television talk shows
Global Television Network original programming
1977 Canadian television series debuts
Canadian religious television series
Yes TV original programming
Television shows filmed in Ontario
Burlington, Ontario
Television series about Christianity
1980s Canadian television talk shows
1990s Canadian television talk shows
2000s Canadian television talk shows
2010s Canadian television talk shows
2020s Canadian television talk shows